"Thaxted" is a hymn tune by the English composer Gustav Holst, based on the stately theme from the middle section of the Jupiter movement of his orchestral suite The Planets and named after Thaxted, the English village where he lived much of his life.  He adapted the theme in 1921 to fit the patriotic poem "I Vow to Thee, My Country" by Cecil Spring Rice but that was as a unison song with orchestra.  It did not appear as a hymn-tune called "Thaxted" until his friend Ralph Vaughan Williams included it in Songs of Praise in 1926.

The tune

Hymns written to the tune

Many Christian hymns have been written to the tune.  Notable ones include:

 
 "I Vow to Thee, My Country" – Cecil Spring Rice, 1921. This setting was sung at the wedding of Prince Charles and Diana, Princess of Wales in 1981 and again at the latter's funeral in 1997, and the funeral of Margaret Thatcher in 2013.
 "O God Beyond All Praising"  – Michael Perry, 1982.
 "We Praise You and Acknowledge You, O God" – a paraphrase of the Te Deum Laudamus by Stephen P. Starke in the 2006 Lutheran Service Book
 "The Answer" – song with lyrics by Corrinne May, which appears on her fourth album, The Gift.
"The Iron Rod" – a hymn using lyrics from a hymn of the same name in the hymn book of the Church of Jesus Christ of Latter-day Saints (LDS Church).

Other uses
The tune has been played at various major events:
 The funeral service of United States Senator John McCain at the Washington National Cathedral on 1 September 2018.
The funeral of Prince Philip, Duke of Edinburgh, in Windsor Castle on the 17th of April 2021.
The funeral Mass of Justice Antonin Scalia in the Basilica of the National Shrine of the Immaculate Conception.

Secular songs written to the tune include:
 "In the Quest for Understanding" – sesquicentennial anthem for Lawrence University in Appleton, Wisconsin
 "World in Union" – the anthem with lyrics by Charlie Skarbek, introduced at the 1991 Rugby World Cup
 The alma mater of various schools including Cinco Ranch High School in Katy, Texas, Flower Mound High School in Flower Mound, Texas, Ronald Reagan High School in San Antonio, Texas, Westwood High School in Austin, Texas and Wesley College in Melbourne, Victoria.
 The noise rock band Harvey Milk used Thaxted as a section in their song "The Anvil Will Fall".
 English folk trio Kerr Fagan Harbron used Thaxted as an introduction to the song "Leaving Old England".
 The Swedish extreme metal band Bathory used Thaxted as the basis for the song "Hammerheart" on the album Twilight of the Gods
 Japanese singer Ayaka Hirahara released the song "Jupiter", based on the melody, in December 2003. It went to No. 2 on the Oricon charts and sold nearly a million copies, making it the third-best-selling single in the Japanese popular music market for 2004. It remained on the charts for over three years. Japanese girl group Little Glee Monster covered the song for the 2017 TV series Rikuoh, and also included the cover on their 2018 album Juice.
Sarah Brightman recorded the song "Running" in 2007. It was the theme song for the IAAF Championships; she performed it at the opening ceremony in Osaka.
 A choral adaptation of the tune for women's voices features prominently in the 2003 film Mona Lisa Smile.
Maddy Prior includes the tune in two pieces of her 2003 album Lionhearts.

Other uses of the melody include:
The credits theme for the 2001 Sega video game Cyber Troopers Virtual-On Force.
The Civilization V soundtrack as the theme of the English civilization.
 The children's show Bluey used the tune in a second season episode named "Sleepytime". 

A literary reference appears in "The Adventure of the Lost World", a Sherlock Holmes pastiche written by Dominic Green, where the tune is a major plot element, though the story contains a chronological error in that its Autumn 1918 setting would pre-date the publishing of the tune under the name "Thaxted".

References

External links
 Thaxted sheet music (PDF)
 .

Compositions by Gustav Holst
Hymn tunes
1921 songs